() is a Spanish and Portuguese martial art which developed in the regions along the Minho River: Minho, Trás-os-Montes, Pontevedra and Ourense, focusing on the use of a staff of fixed measures and characteristics. The origins of this martial art are disputed, but its purpose was primarily self-defence. It was also used to settle arguments and matters of honour between individuals, families, and even villages. While popular in the northern mountains, it was practically unknown elsewhere, and those who did practice it were taught by masters from the North of Portugal and Galicia.

History 
The popularity of this martial art was partly due to the demeanor of the northern folk, who valued personal and family honor enough to kill for it. It was also due in no small part to the relative ease of obtaining a staff as well as the versatility of such a tool: a staff or stick was almost universally present, used as a support for the long daily walks, to help cross the rivers, by the shepherds to protect the cattle from wild animals, and so on. There are references to this martial art being used by the guerrillas against the troops of Napoleon that were occupying Lisbon during the Peninsular War.

Origin 

The origins of the jogo do pau are medieval civil techniques of combat, used in times of war by foot soldiers who were often poor peasants who could not afford a better weapon. Evidence of this are found, for instance, from reports on the Battle of Aljubarrota. The technique was incorporated into horseback riding in the medieval book  by Edward I of Portugal (1391–1438). This martial art developed not in the urban areas more open to foreign influences, but in Galiza and the most isolated mountain regions of continental Portugal.

During the 19th century, jogo do pau was brought to Lisboa by northern masters, resulting in an amalgamation with the technique of the Gameirosabre, growing into a sports competition, removed from actual combat. It was practiced in clubs such as the Ginásio Clube Português and the Ateneu Comercial de Lisboa.

Modern practice 
In the 20th century, the practice of jogo do pau suffered a quick decline due to the migrations from rural areas to the cities and the greater ease in access to firearms.  The players born between 1910 and 1930 were the last generation to experience the flowering of the sport. The memories of this generation provided a continuity in the 1970s, when the sport was revived. The driving force of this revival was Pedro Ferreira, followed by his student Nuno Curvello Russo, who dedicated his life's ambition to jogo do pau, frequently visiting the North of Portugal, getting acquainted with surviving variants there, especially with the school of Cabeceiras de Basto. He studied at the Ateneu Comercial de Lisboa, whose master is now Manuel Monteiro. Today, the sport is still rather marginal in Portugal, but there is a stable number of practitioners organized in two federations: the Federação Portuguesa de Jogo do Pau and the Federação Nacional do Jogo do Pau Português. This art is also practised in the Azores and Madeira, and outside Portugal in Galicia, Spain.

See also 
 Juego del palo
 Ball de bastons
 Jōdō
 Historical European Martial Arts

Further reading

References

External links 
  by Luis Preto
  by Nuno Curvello Russo (Translated by Tony Wolf and Gonçalo Costa)
 
  by Taistelija Films (HTML5)
 
 

Stick-fighting 
Galician culture
Spanish culture
Portuguese culture
European martial arts
Martial arts in Portugal
Martial arts in Spain